The Chitina Tin Shop, also known as Fred's Place and Schaupp's, is a historic retail building on Main Street in Chitina, Alaska. It is a wood-frame structure, two stories in height, with a flat-topped false front in front of a gable roof. It was built in 1912 by Fred Schaupp, during Chitina's building boom following the arrival of the Copper River and Northwestern Railway. The building is one of only a few surviving tin shops (essentially a metalworking facility) in the state. The first floor was occupied by the workshop, while living quarters were above. Following the closing of the railroad in 1938, the building has seen a variety of other uses. The building has been restored, and now houses an art gallery.

The building was listed on the National Register of Historic Places in 1979.

See also
National Register of Historic Places listings in Copper River Census Area, Alaska

References

1912 establishments in Alaska
Art museums and galleries in Alaska
Buildings and structures on the National Register of Historic Places in Copper River Census Area, Alaska
Commercial buildings completed in 1912
Commercial buildings on the National Register of Historic Places in Alaska
Metal companies of the United States
Retail buildings in Alaska
Tin